Sabrina Richter (née Neukamp; born 10 May 1982) is a German handball player. She plays for the club ProVital Blomberg-Lippe and for the German national team.

She represented Germany at the Beijing 2008 Summer Olympics, where Germany placed 11th. She participates at the 2009 World Women's Handball Championship in China.

References

External links

1982 births
Living people
German female handball players
Handball players at the 2008 Summer Olympics
Olympic handball players of Germany